A Woman Who Knows What She Wants is a 1934 Czechoslovak musical comedy film directed by Victor Janson and starring Lil Dagover, Anton Edthofer, and Anton Walbrook, a German-language version of Czech film A Woman Who Knows What She Wants. It is an adaptation of a 1932 stage musical of the same title, with music by Oscar Straus. It was filmed at the Barrandov Studios in Prague.

The musical was adapted again as a 1958 West German film of the same title.

Cast
Lil Dagover as Mona Cavallini, Revuestar
Anton Edthofer as Erik Mattisson, industrialist
Maria Beling as Karin, his daughter
Anton Walbrook as Axel Basse
Kurt Vespermann as Peter Kasten
Hans Junkermann as Dr. Frank Heyberg, lawyer
Werner Finck as Kalmann, press secretary
Hubert von Meyerinck as Lynge, banker
Inge John as Kalman's secretary
Leo Peukert as Almers, director
Pepi Glöckner-Kramer as Babette, wardrobe mistress
Franz Scharwenka as President of Paranarena
C. W. Tetting as his Adjutant
Michael von Newlinsky as Prim

References

External links

1934 musical comedy films
Czech musical comedy films
Czechoslovak musical comedy films
Films directed by Victor Janson
Films based on works by Louis Verneuil
Films based on operettas
Films based on adaptations
Czech black-and-white films
1934 multilingual films
1930s Czech films